The PSSI Anniversary Cup is a four-team under-23 association football tournament held at Pakansari Stadium in Cibinong, Bogor Regency, Indonesia. It has been held annually since 2018. The tournament is organised to commemorate the anniversary of Football Association of Indonesia (PSSI).

Results

References 

International association football competitions hosted by Indonesia
Recurring sporting events established in 2018